Hedycarya is a genus of dioecious trees and shrubs of the family Monimiaceae. Species occur in South East Asia, New Caledonia, Australia and Polynesia including New Zealand. 
The genus was named and formerly described in 1776 by botanists Johann and Georg Forster in Characteres Generum Plantarum.
The limit of the genus may require change as it appears paraphyletic in phylogenetic analyses, with the genera Kibaropsis and Levieria nested in it.

Selected species
Hedycarya alternifolia Hemsl. – 
Hedycarya angustifolia A.Cunn. – Australian, Austral or Native Mulberry (native to Australia)
Hedycarya aragoensis Jérémie– (endemic to New Caledonia)
Hedycarya arborea J.R.Forst. & G.Forst.– Pigeonwood or Porokaiwhiri   (endemic to New Zealand)
Hedycarya badaunii Baill.– (endemic to New Caledonia)
Hedycarya balansaei Perkins – 
Hedycarya caledonica Guillaumin – 
Hedycarya chrysophylla Perkins– (endemic to New Caledonia)
Hedycarya comptonii S.Moore – 
Hedycarya crassifolia Gillespie – 
Hedycarya cupulata Baill.– Niambo (endemic to New Caledonia)
Hedycarya denticulata (A.Gray) Perkins & Gilg– (endemic to Samoa)
Hedycarya dorstenioides A.Gray – 
Hedycarya engleriana S.Moore– (endemic to New Caledonia)
Hedycarya erythrocarpa Perkins – 
Hedycarya grandiflora Perkins – 
Hedycarya microcarpa Perkins – 
Hedycarya neoebudica Guillaumin – 
Hedycarya ovalifolia Guillaumin – 
Hedycarya parvifolia Perkins & Schltr.– (endemic to New Caledonia)
Hedycarya perbracteolata Jérémie– (endemic to New Caledonia)
Hedycarya perkinsiana S.Moore – 
Hedycarya rivularis Guillaumin– (endemic to New Caledonia)
Hedycarya saligna S.Moore – 
Hedycarya sinuato–dentata Perkins – 
Hedycarya spectabilis Perkins – 
Hedycarya symplocoides S.Moore– (endemic to New Caledonia)
Hedycarya tapeinospermifolia Guillaumin – 
Hedycarya verticillata Guillaumin
 list sources :

References

Monimiaceae genera
Dioecious plants